Crematogaster ampullaris is a species of ant in tribe Crematogastrini. It was described by Smith in 1861.

References

ampullaris
Insects described in 1861